was a town located in Ihara District, Shizuoka Prefecture, Japan.

As of November 2008, the town had an estimated population of 16,359 and a density of 529 persons per km². The total area was 30.92 km².

On November 1, 2008, Fujikawa was merged into the expanded city of Fuji. Ihara District was dissolved as a result of this merger.

Fujikawa Village was founded on April 1, 1889. It attained town status on January 25, 1901. The town had a station (Fujikawa Station on the Tōkaidō Main Line and an interchange on the Tōmei Expressway. The view of the Tōkaidō Shinkansen crossing a bridge with Mount Fuji in the background that is still used in many tourist promotion publications for Japan was taken at Fujikawa.

References

Populated places established in 1889
Populated places disestablished in 2008
2008 disestablishments in Japan
Dissolved municipalities of Shizuoka Prefecture
Fuji, Shizuoka